Henry Ball may refer to:

 Henry Lidgbird Ball (1756–1818), Royal Navy officer
 Henry John Ball ( 1820–1874), Hong Kong Judge and government official
 Henry Ball (priest) (died 1603), Archdeacon of Chichester, 1596–1603

See also
Harry Ball (disambiguation)